Tenshō Kōtai Jingūkyō (Japanese ) is a Japanese new religious movement which emerged from Shinto. It was established by Sayo Kitamura (1900–1967), with activities beginning in 1945. The movement includes 450,000 members. Kitamura claimed possession by Amaterasu under the title Tenshō-Kōtaijin.

Its headquarters are in Tabuse (Tabuse-chō), a town in the district of Kumage District, Yamaguchi, Japan.

Followers practice a dance called muga no mai ("Dance of the non-self" or "Dance of the non-ego"), which is why the religion is called the "dancing religion" (Odoru shūkyō).

See also 
 Anatta / Anātman (jap. muga)

References

Further reading 
 Tina Hamrin: Dansreligionen i japansk immigrantmiljö på Hawai'i. Via helbrägdagörare och Jodu shinshu-präster till nationalistisk millennarism. (English summary: The Dancing Religion in a Japanese-Hawaiian Immigrant Environment). Stockholm: Almqvist & Wiksell International, 1996. (Acta Universitatis Stockholmiensis. Stockholm Studies in Comparative Religion) - Review
 NISHIYAMA Shigeru & FUJII Takeshi: . 1991, 1997 Institute for Japanese Culture and Classics, Kokugakuin University.
 Clark B. Offner: The Work of the Holy Spirit in the Japanese Cultural Setting (PDF; 2,3 MB), S. 57ff.
 Sayo Kitamura: Tensho Kotai Jingu-Kyo (1): The Dancing Religion, Contemporary Religions in Japan 2 (3), (1961), 26–42
 L. Carlyle May: The Dancing Religion: A Japanese Messianic Sect, Southwestern Journal of Anthropology 10 (1), (1954), 119–137

External links 
 Tenshō Kōtai Jingūkyō
 Glossary of Shinto Names and Terms

New religious movements
Shinto
Religious organizations
Tabuse, Yamaguchi